Once a Hero is a 1931 American comedy film directed by Fatty Arbuckle and starring Emerson Treacy.

Cast
 Emerson Treacy
 Betty Grable as Frances Dean
 Jack Shutta

See also
 Fatty Arbuckle filmography

External links

1931 films
1931 comedy films
1931 short films
Films directed by Roscoe Arbuckle
American black-and-white films
American comedy short films
Films with screenplays by Jack Townley
1930s English-language films
1930s American films